The Croatian Coldblood is an autochthonous medium-heavy horse breed of draught horse originating from Croatia.

Characteristics

Its head is medium-sized and refined, with small ears, but with large eyes and nostrils. It has medium short, arched and muscular neck, wide and deep chest, broad and muscular breast, as well as powerful legs with broad hooves.

Most Croatian Coldbloods are bay or seal brown. Of the remaining horses, approximately 10-15 percent are black, and less than 10 percent are chestnut, gray, flaxen chestnut, while the other colours are very rare.

They are considered mild and obedient, easy keepers, willing workers and adapt well to various conditions and climates. Earlier, they were used for pulling waggons or for work in agriculture or forestry, but today they have lost their importance as draft animals and are being widely used for horse meat production.

History

The history of the breed dates back to the first half of the 19th century, when it was begun to crossbreed local warmblood mares in central Croatia with imported quality stallions of Noriker breed. Some other breeds were involved later, like Ardennes, Brabant and Percheron. At the beginning of the 20th century the breed was widespread toward east (Slavonia) and west (Gorski kotar and Istria regions).

In the last few decades, the Croatian Coldblood was the most numerous horse breed in Croatia in general. The total number of the registered population in 2008 was 5,334 or 33.77% of all horses (15,796) in Croatia. The number of horses of the breed was increased by 10.74% in the last four years, from 5,334 in 2008 to 5,907 in 2012.

See also

 List of horse breeds in DAD-IS
 List of mammals of Croatia
 Međimurje horse
 Posavac horse

References 
 Croatian Coldblood – an authentic Croatian horsebreed
  Croatian Coldblood in the scientific work „Analysis of horse breeding and equestrian sports in the Repubulic of Croatia“
 Croatian Coldblood in 2012 – the most numerous breed in Croatia (in Croatian)
 Croatian Coldblood (with average height at the withers: 150-160 cm) in a brochure of State Institute for Nature Protection (in Croatian)
 Genetic structure of three Croatian horse breeds: implications for their conservation strategy
 Horse breeding in the Republic of Croatia – present situation and perspectives (summary in English at the end)

Horse breeds originating in Croatia
Horse breeds
Mammals of Europe
Conservation Priority Breeds of the Livestock Conservancy